This is a list of former artists who have recorded for Def Jam Recordings, organized alphabetically by last name.

Listed in parentheses are names of Def Jam affiliated labels, under which the artist recorded.



A
 Amerie
 Amil (Roc-A-Fella/Def Jam)
 Andre Bowen (Def Jam/Columbia)
 Arlissa
 Ashanti (The Inc./Def Jam)	
 Asher Roth
 August Alsina
 Aztek Escobar (Roc La Familia/Def Jam)

B
 Babyface
 Bamby H2O
 Beastie Boys 
 Beanie Sigel (Roc-A-Fella/State Property/Def Jam)
 Beau Young Prince
 Bernard Jabs
 Bibi Bourelly
 Big Audio Dynamite
 Big Boi
 Big K.R.I.T. (Cinematic/Def Jam)
 Billz
 B.G. Knocc Out & Dresta (Outburst/Def Jam)
 BLENDA (Star Trak/Def Jam)
 Bless (Def Jam)
 Bobby Valentino (Disturbing Tha Peace/Def Jam) 
 Bone
 Bo$$
 Black Child (JMJ/The Inc./Def Jam)
 The Braxtons

C
 Calvin Jeremy (Def Jam Jakarta)
 Cam'ron (Diplomat/Roc-A-Fella/Def Jam)
 Capleton
 Capone
 Capone-N-Noreaga
 Case
 Charli Baltimore (The Inc./Def Jam)
 Chingy (Disturbing tha Peace/Def Jam)
 CKY (Island Records/Def Jam)
 Common (ARTium/Def Jam)
 Comp
 Corey Franks (Def Soul)
 Cormega
 Cosha TG (Mosley Music Group/Def Jam)
 CyHi the Prynce (GOOD/Def Jam)

D
 Da 5 Footaz (G-Funk Music/Def Jam)
 Davy DMX
 Dee The Mad Bitch & DJ King Assassin
 Def Squad
 Desiigner (GOOD/Def Jam)
 The Diplomats (Roc-A-Fella/Def Jam)
 diveliner
 DJ Clue? (Roc-A-Fella/Desert Storm/Def Jam)
 Domino (Outburst/Def Jam)
 Dominic Lord
 The Don
 Downtown Science
 The Dove Shack (G-Funk Music/Def Jam)
 Dru Hill (Def Soul/Def Jam)

E
 Ed Harlem
 EPMD
 Erick Sermon

F
 Corey Franks (Def Soul)
 Fam-Lay (Star Trak/Def Jam)
 Fetty Luciano
 Flatlinerz
 Foxy Brown (Roc-A-Fella/Def Jam)
 Frank Ocean
 Freeway (Roc-A-Fella/Def Jam)
 Funkmaster Flex
 Flesh-N-Bone (Mo Thug/Def Jam)
 FYA

G
 Grafh (Roc-A-Fella/Dame Dash Music Group/Def Jam)
 Ghostface Killah (Starks Enterprises/Def Jam)
 GUN40
 Gunplay (MMG/Def Jam)
 GWH (The Inc./Def Jam)

H
 Headless Horsemen
 Héctor el Father (Roc La Familia/Gold Star Music/Machete Music/VI Music)
 Hollis Crew
 Honeyz (Mercury/Def Jam)
 Hose
 Hostyle
 HXLT (GOOD/Def Jam)

I
 The Isley Brothers (Def Soul/Def Jam)

J
 Ja Rule (The Inc./Def Jam)
 Jay-Z (Roc-A-Fella/Def Jam)
 Jayo Felony
 Jazzy Jay
 Jimmy Spicer
 Joe Budden
 Jonell (Def Soul/Def Jam)
 Juelz Santana

K
 K. Roosevelt
 Kacy Hill (GOOD/Def Jam)
 Kaleb Mitchell
 Keith Murray
 Kelly Price (Def Soul/Def Jam)

L
 Lady Luck (rapper)
 Lady Sovereign (Def Jam/Island Records)
 Landstrip Chip
 Lil Durk
 Lil Ru
 LovHer (Dragon/Def Soul/Def Jam)
 Lul G

M
 M.O.P. (Roc-A-Fella/Def Jam)
 Mak Sauce (Run-It-Up/Def Jam)
 Mariah Carey
 Masio Gunz
 MC Serch
 Memphis Bleek (Roc-A-Fella/Get Low/Def Jam)
 Method Man
 Method Man & Redman
 Christina Milian (Def Soul/Def Jam)
 MoKenStef (Outburst/Def Jam)
 Montell Jordan
 Musiq (Def Soul)

N
 N.O.R.E. (Thugged Out/Roc La Familia/Def Jam)
 N-Dubz
 NASAAN
 Ne-Yo (Compound/Def Jam)
 Neef Buck (Roc-A-Fella/Def Jam)
 Nefew (Bases Loaded/Def Jam)
 Nikki D
 Nimic Revenue
 Nova Rockefeller

O
 Onyx (Chaos/JMJ/Def Jam)
 Oran "Juice" Jones (OBR/Def Jam)
 Original Concept

P
 Patti LaBelle (Def Soul/Def Jam)
 Payroll Giovanni & Cardo
 Peedi Peedi (Roc-A-Fella/Def Jam)
 Playa (Def Soul/Def Jam)
 Kelly Price (Def Soul/Def Jam)
 Prime Minister Pete Nice & Daddy Rich
 Public Enemy
 Pvrx

R
 Redman
 Rell (Roc-A-Fella/Def Jam; Dame Dash Music Group/Def Jam)
 Richie Rich
 Rick Ross (Slip-N-Slide/Def Jam; Maybach/Def Jam)
 Megan Rochell
 Ron Isley (Def Soul/Def Jam)
 Rihanna

S
 Saukrates
 S3nsi Molly & Lil Brook
 Shawnna (Disturbing tha Peace/Def Jam)
 Serius Jones (Disturbing tha Peace/Def Jam)
 State Property (Roc-A-Fella/State Property/Def Jam)
 Shyne (Gangland/Def Jam)
 Sisqó (Dragon/Def Soul/Def Jam)
 Sizzla (Dame Dash Music Group/Def Jam)
 Slayer
 Slick Rick
 SM*SH (Ancora Music/Def Jam)
 Sneakk
 South Central Cartel
 Static Major (Blackground/Def Jam)
 Steph Jones (Disturbing Tha Peace/Def Jam)

T
 T La Rock
 Teairra Mari (Roc-A-Fella/Def Jam)
 Teriyaki Boyz (BAPE/Def Jam, USA/Japan)
 TJ Porter
 Trap Beckham
 Trinidad James
 Troi Irons (Circa 13/Def Jam)
 Tru Life (Roc La Familia/Roc-A-Fella/Def Jam)
 Twinz

U
 Uncle Murda (Manhood/GMG/Roc-A-Fella/Def Jam)
 Hikaru Utada

W
 Terri Walker (Def Soul/Def Jam)
 Warren G (Violator/Def Jam)
 Warren Stacey
 WC
 Alyson Williams
 Nicole Wray (Roc-A-Fella/Def Jam, Dame Dash Music Group/Def Jam)
 WAX

X

Y
 YFL Kelvin
 Young Chris (Roc-A-Fella/Def Jam)
 Young Gunz (Roc-A-Fella/Def Jam)
 Yung Chase (100/Def Jam)
 Yung Tory (Mosley Music Group/Def Jam)

#
 10k.Caash
 3rd Bass

See also
 List of current Def Jam Recordings artists

Def Jam Recordings, former